The 1919 Coupe de France Final was a football match held at Parc des Princes, Paris on 6 April 1919, that saw CASG Paris defeat Olympique de Paris 3–2 thanks to goals by Emilien Devic and Louis Hatzfeld (2).

Match details

See also
Coupe de France 1918-1919

External links
Coupe de France results at Rec.Sport.Soccer Statistics Foundation
Report on French federation site

1919
Coupe De France Final
April 1919 sports events
1919 in Paris